The Southern Homestead Act of 1866 is a United States federal law enacted to break a cycle of debt during the Reconstruction following the American Civil War. Prior to this act, blacks and whites alike were having trouble buying land. Sharecropping and tenant farming had become ways of life. This act attempted to solve this by selling land at low prices so Southerners could buy it. Many people, however, could still not participate because the low prices were still too high.

Legislative history
A "Second Freedmen's Bureau bill" was introduced December 5, 1865, but was vetoed and weakened before eventually overriding a second veto by president Andrew Johnson. Championed by General Oliver O. Howard, chief of the Freedmen's Bureau, and with support from Thaddeus Stevens and William Fessenden, the Southern Homestead Act was proposed to Congress, and eventually passed, and signed into law by President Andrew Johnson on June 21, 1866, going into effect immediately. The Southern Homestead Act opened up 46,398,544.87 acres (about 46 million acres or 190,000 km²) of public land for sale in the Southern states of Alabama, Arkansas, Florida, Louisiana, and Mississippi.

Until January 1, 1867, the bill specified, only free Blacks and White Unionists would be allowed access to these lands. Accordingly, the primary beneficiaries for the first six months were freedmen who were in desperate need of land to till. However, the law encountered many obstacles, notably: Southern bureaucrats often did not comply with the law or with the orders of the Freedmen's Bureau, notably not informing blacks of their opportunity to acquire land; violence from competing whites; poor quality of the land; and poverty of the farmers who were often unable to effectively use the land without further money to invest.

Ultimately, before too much land was distributed, the law was repealed in June 1876. Nevertheless, free Blacks entered about 6,500 claims to homesteads, and about 1,000 of these eventually resulted in property certificates.

See also
 Homestead Acts

References

Further reading
 
 Oubre, Claude F. Forty Acres and a Mule: The Freedmen's Bureau and Black Land Ownership. Louisiana State University Press, 1978.

1866 in American law
United States federal public land legislation
1866 in the United States
June 1866 events
History of the Southern United States